After the Lights Go Down Low and Much More!!! is the debut album of Freda Payne, released in 1964. Duke Ellington's "Blue Piano" makes its first album appearance, while the majority of the songs on this album are cover songs and jazz standards. The six songs on the first side of the album were recorded on September 17 and 18 of 1963, while the second side was recorded on September 19 of that year (Payne's twenty-first birthday). This album was reissued on CD in Japan in January 2002 and then on September 13, 2005 in the United States.

Track listing

Personnel 
 Freda Payne – vocals
 Manny Albam – arranger and conductor

Additional musicians 
Side 1
 Trumpets – Nick Travis, Ernie Royal, Al De Risi, Jimmy Nottingham
 Trombones – Alan Raph, Quentin Jackson, Bob Brookmeyer
 Alto saxophone – Phil Woods
 Tenor saxophones – Zoot Sims, Seldon Powell
 Baritone saxophone – Sol Schlinger
 Piano – Hank Jones
 Bass – Art Davis
 Drums – Gus Johnson, Jr.

Side 2
 Alto saxophone – Phil Woods
 Drums – Walter Perkins
 Piano – Hank Jones
 Bass – Art Davis
 Guitar – Jim Hall

Technical personnel 
 Producer – Bob Thiele
 Engineer – Bob Simpson
 Cover and liner photos – Joe Alper
 Liner design – Joe Lebow

References 

1964 debut albums
Freda Payne albums
Albums produced by Bob Thiele
Impulse! Records albums
Albums arranged by Manny Albam
Albums conducted by Manny Albam